The Eastern Railway was a  long railway line operating in northern Turkey from 1925 to 1927. Along with the Anatolian—Baghdad Railways and the Railway Construction and Management Administration, the Eastern Railway was one of the three railways that merged in 1927, to form the State Railways and Seaports Administration, the direct predecessor to the Turkish State Railways.

The railway was founded in 1925 by the Turkish government and headquartered in Erzurum. The purpose of the railway was to take over ownership and operations of the Transcaucasus Railway within Turkey.

References

Erzurum
Railway companies of Turkey
Railway lines opened in 1925
1927 disestablishments in Turkey
Railway lines closed in 1927
Turkish companies established in 1925